Two ships of the French Navy have borne the name Napoléon in honour of Napoléon I

  (1850), a steam aviso, bore the name before being commissioned in the French Navy
  (1850), the first purpose-built steam battleship in the world

See also
 List of French privateers named for Napoleon Bonaparte
 Napoléon-class ship of the line, of the French Navy
 Napoleon (ship), various ships

French Navy ship names